The Embassy of Syria in London was the diplomatic mission of the Syrian Arab Republic to the United Kingdom. The chancery is located at 8 Belgrave Square of London.

Since the start of the Syrian Civil War the embassy has seen several protests: by those opposed to government of Bashar al-Assad in 2011 and 2012 and by the well-known Islamist Anjem Choudary in 2013. The British government, along with several other countries, expelled the Syrian ambassador in May 2012 in protest at the escalating violence in the country. The embassy is currently closed.

See also 
 List of Ambassadors from the United Kingdom to Syria

References

External links
Official site

Syria
London
Syria–United Kingdom relations
Buildings and structures in the City of Westminster
Belgravia